Hugo Salazar Tamariz (Cuenca, September 2, 1923 – Guayaquil, January 31, 1999) was an Ecuador poet, novelist and playwright. His writing is marked by socialist realism.

Works
 Otra historia del mismo Lobo (1964), novel
 The Indian in the Novels of Ciro Alegría (1965) essay
 Los constructores del amanecer: novela (1995), novel
 El mago, agitador profesional: novela (2002), novel
 Transparencia en el trébol (1948)
 Diálogo con una gente intransigente (1988)
 El habitante amenazado: (poema contra el pacto militar) (1955)
 La llaga (1962), play
 La falsa muerte de un ciclista (1968), play
 En tiempos de la colonia (1979), play
 Toque de queda, play
 Por un plato de arroz, play
 El habitante amenzado (1973), play
 Sinfonía de los antepasados (1960)
 Pirañas (1996)
 Teatro (1986)
 Otra historia del mismo lobo (1960)

References 

1923 births
1999 deaths
Ecuadorian male writers
Ecuadorian poets
Ecuadorian novelists
Ecuadorian dramatists and playwrights
People from Cuenca, Ecuador
20th-century novelists
20th-century poets
20th-century dramatists and playwrights
20th-century male writers